Ellen Violet Jordan  (née Perrett; 29 June 1913 – 7 May 1982) was an Australian politician. She was the second woman elected to the Queensland Legislative Assembly, and the first representing the Labor Party.

Early life 
Jordan was born in Ipswich to James Berties Perrett and Anne Jane Jordan, née Brown. She attended Brassall State School and then Ipswich Girls' Grammar School before earning a Diploma of Education and becoming a schoolteacher. On 14 June 1932 she married David Jordan, with whom she had two children.

Politics 
Joining the Australian Labor Party in 1946, Jordan was a delegate to the Labor-in-Politics Convention in 1956. She was the inaugural president of the Women's Central Committee Queensland from 1956 to 1967 and secretary of the Ipswich Labor Party Executive from 1958 to 1965. In 1961 she became the first woman elected to Ipswich City Council, serving until 1967.

In 1966 she was elected to the Queensland Legislative Assembly as the member for Ipswich West. She was the first Labor woman elected to the Assembly, and the first woman in parliament since Irene Longman's defeat in 1932. Jordan was defeated in 1974, after which she became the inaugural president of the Australian ALP Women's Executive.

Later life 
Jordan died at Ipswich in 1982. She was buried in the Ipswich General Cemetery alongside her husband who had predeceased her in 1967.

Legacy 
The electoral district of Jordan created in the 2017 Queensland state electoral redistribution was named after her.

References

1913 births
1982 deaths
Members of the Queensland Legislative Assembly
Members of the Order of Australia
People from Ipswich, Queensland
Burials at Ipswich General Cemetery
Australian Labor Party members of the Parliament of Queensland
20th-century Australian politicians
Women members of the Queensland Legislative Assembly
20th-century Australian women politicians